The St Kilda Football Club, nicknamed the Saints, is a professional Australian rules football club based in Melbourne, Victoria. The club plays in the Australian Football League (AFL), the sport's premier league.

The club's name originates from its original home base in the bayside Melbourne suburb of St Kilda in which the club was established in 1873. The club also has strong links to the south-eastern suburb of Moorabbin, due to it being the long-standing location of their training ground.

St Kilda were one of five foundation teams of the Victorian Football Association (VFA), now known as the Victorian Football League (VFL), and later became one of eight foundation teams of the original Victorian Football League in 1897, now known as the AFL. Additionally, St Kilda are in an alignment with the Sandringham Football Club in the modern VFL.

St Kilda have won a single premiership to date, a one-point win in the 1966 VFL Grand Final against Collingwood. They have also qualified for the grand final on six additional occasions. The club has won the minor premiership three times, in 1965, 1997 and 2009.

St Kilda developed a reputation as perennial underachievers, much of this attributed to their record of finishing last more often than any other club in the league (27 times), having the longest-continuous premiership drought (56 years), as well as having the second-lowest all-time win percentage of any team still playing in the league (after the Gold Coast Suns).

History

1873–1915: Early years

On 14 March 1873, a meeting was held in Windsor to form the St Kilda Football Club. At this meeting, a provisional committee of men were elected. The formation was completed on 2 April 1873, and on 11 June 1873 another meeting was held to appoint the final committee. The club's original home ground was colloquially nicknamed the "Alpaca Paddock", which was a large fenced-off area at the St Kilda end of what is now known as Albert Park.

During its formation years, the club underwent multiple mergers. In June 1873, it merged with the South Yarra Football Club and adopted the red from their colour scheme. In 1875, the club briefly merged with University to stay financially viable. In March 1888, a decision was made to amalgamate St Kilda with nearby Prahran Football Club. St Kilda retained their colours, name and ground as well as picking up a number of Prahran players. St Kilda competed as a senior club in the VFA from 1877 to 1879, 1881 to 1882 and 1886 to 1896 before accepting an invitation into the breakaway competition, the Victorian Football League, from 1897 onwards.

St Kilda were one of the eight clubs that took part in the inaugural VFL season in 1897. They made their debut in an away game against Collingwood on 8 May 1897 at Victoria Park. The club's home ground in the new league was the Junction Oval in the suburb of St Kilda, Victoria and the club's first home game was against Fitzroy.

St Kilda's early years in the VFL were not successful and, in 1899, they had the lowest score ever recorded in a VFL/AFL match, one point against Geelong. The club lost 48 consecutive games, recording their first win on 5 May 1900, against Melbourne. This match initially ended as a draw, but a protest launched by St Kilda saw the result overturned, resulting in a 1-point victory to St Kilda.

In 1902, Charlie Baker became the first St Kilda player to be the league's leading goalkicker in a home and away season with 30 goals.

Six successive wins at the start of the 1907 season helped St Kilda to its first finals appearance, qualifying third with nine wins and eight losses. The club was beaten by eventual premiers Carlton. The following year, the club once again qualified in third position and were again eliminated by Carlton in the semi-finals.

The 1913 season saw major improvement with the team finishing fourth, eventually being defeated in the Grand Final by Fitzroy. Owing to the finals system at the time, Fitzroy, who had been defeated by St Kilda the previous week, were allowed to challenge St Kilda to a rematch the following week. St Kilda lost the rematch 7.14 (56) to 5.13 (43).

1916–1949: World wars and individual success 

Owing to World War I, St Kilda went into recess in 1916 and 1917. Just prior to their recession, the club temporarily changed their official colours to include yellow in place of white. This was done to avoid association with the German Empire, who had the same colours as St Kilda at the time. The club resumed normal operation in 1918 and fared well initially, qualifying for finals and being defeated in the semi-finals. However, the following years saw St Kilda consistently struggle with poor form. The club qualified for finals once between 1919 and 1938, although during this time period Colin Watson became the first St Kilda player to win the league's highest individual award, winning the 1925 Brownlow Medal. Additionally in 1936, forward Bill Mohr kicked 101 goals, winning the leading goalkicker award and becoming the first St Kilda player to kick 100 goals or more in a season.

The club qualified for finals in 1939, finishing the season in fourth after a record run of eight consecutive victories. The team had its first finals win since 1913, against Richmond, but were eliminated in the preliminary final by Collingwood.

St Kilda won three of the first four games early in the 1940 season and were on top of the ladder after Round 4, however, the club went on to finish second last. Despite prominent players emerging for the club such as Harold Bray, Keith Drinan, Peter Bennett and later Neil Roberts, St Kilda were rarely competitive for the duration of the 1940s.

1950–1973: Failure and success
The 1950s were initially as uncompetitive for St Kilda as the prior decade. The club failed to make the finals for the first half of the decade, and won three wooden spoons over the period. At the end of 1955, Alan Killigrew was appointed as the club's coach. As part of Killigrew's plan to reinvigorate the club, 17 players were removed from the club's list - one of the most substantial list turnovers in VFL history. Between 1957 and 1959, St Kilda won three consecutive Brownlow Medals. The 1959 winner, Verdun Howell, tied with Bob Skilton in the Brownlow Medal count. At the time, Skilton was awarded the medal on count-back. The league later decided to award a Brownlow Medal to any player who was eligible to win who tied on the same number of votes as a winner who won on count-back – with Howell receiving the Brownlow retrospectively.

In 1958, St Kilda won the Consolation Night Series competition, a competition that was played between clubs that had failed to qualify for the premiership season finals series. St Kilda defeated Carlton 16.13 (109) to 15.11 (101).

In 1961, after finishing sixth in 1960, Allan Jeans was appointed coach. In his first season as coach, St Kilda qualified for the final four for the first time since 1939. The club lost to Footscray in the first semi-final. The club qualified for finals again in 1963, but was eliminated in the semi-finals again. In 1965, St Kilda finished the home and away season as minor premiers for the first time in the club's history. St Kilda defeated Collingwood in the second semi-final to progress into the grand final. The club finished second in the 1965 premiership season, being defeated by Essendon in the 1965 VFL Grand Final.

Following their successful 1965 season, St Kilda qualified for finals in consecutive years for the first time since 1907–08. The club was defeated in the second semi-final by Collingwood - however, the club defeated Essendon in the preliminary final in to qualify for the 1966 VFL Grand Final. St Kilda defeated Collingwood by a single point to win their first premiership in 68 seasons. 
The following year, St Kilda failed to qualify for the finals series, finishing fifth.

Despite continued finals appearances in the early 1970s, St Kilda was unable to win a second premiership - being defeated by the eventual premiers in each finals series between 1970 and 1973. During this 4 year period, St Kilda qualified for the 1971 VFL Grand Final. Despite leading by 20 points at the beginning of the last quarter, they were defeated by Hawthorn by 7 points.

1974-1990: Decline 

1974 saw St Kilda decline to the lower half of the ladder for the first time since the 1950s, finishing tenth. Allan Jeans retired from coaching two years later after 16 seasons coaching St Kilda, citing burnout as his reason for retirement.

Following the appointment of Lindsay Fox as club president in 1979, arrangements were made to address the club's withstanding debt of 1.45 million dollars. Many senior players and Allan Jeans accepted a deal to be paid 22.5 cents for each dollar they were owed. Additionally, non-football creditors received 7.5 cents for each dollar owed. The club was ultimately able to settle with its creditors for $195,000. Despite these efforts, continuing financial pressures and defeats saw the club remain in the bottom three for every season between 1979 and 1986.

In 1987, Tony Lockett won the Coleman Medal for leading goalkicker in the home and away season, the fourth St Kilda player to win the league's leading goalkicker award. Lockett also became the seventh St Kilda player to win the Brownlow Medal. He remains the only person in league history to win both the league's best and fairest Brownlow Medal and the league's leading goalkicker Coleman Medal award in the same season.

1990–1999: AFL era
The league was officially renamed the Australian Football League prior to the start of the 1990 premiership season.

A competitive 1991 AFL season saw St Kilda qualify for a finals series for the first time since 1973, qualifying fourth at the end of the home and away rounds. However, the club failed to win a final, being defeated by Geelong. St Kilda finally broke through the following year, winning its first finals series match since 1973 against Collingwood.

St Kilda won the 1996 Ansett Australia Cup competition, also known as the pre-season cup. The team defeated Carlton in the final 20.10 (130) to 10.12 (72) in front of 66,888 people at Waverley Park. Nicky Winmar became the first St Kilda player to win the Michael Tuck Medal for best player on the ground in the 1996 Ansett Australia Cup Final. Despite this success, the club failed to make the finals.

In the 1997 season, St Kilda qualified for the finals series in first position at the end of the home and away rounds with 15 wins and 7 losses, winning the second minor premiership in the club's history. St Kilda defeated Brisbane in the qualifying finals and North Melbourne in the preliminary finals to move through to the grand final. St Kilda finished second after being beaten in the 1997 AFL Grand Final by Adelaide.

The 1998 season initially appeared to be equally strong for the club. After Round 14 of the season, St Kilda was on top of the ladder in Round 14 with eleven wins and three losses and were tipped as warm favourites for the premiership. However, the team's performance declined severely, losing six of their final eight matches to from first to sixth at the conclusion of the premiership season. After qualifying for the finals in consecutive seasons, St Kilda were defeated narrowly by Sydney in the qualifying finals and then eliminated comprehensively by Melbourne in the semi-finals.

2000–2011: Wooden spoon to premiership contender

During the early part of the decade, St Kilda struggled, winning only two matches and drawing one to finish with the wooden spoon in 2000. The following two years were similar, finishing second-last in both seasons. During this period, St Kilda recruited players such as Justin Koschitzke, Nick Riewoldt, Nick Dal Santo and Brendon Goddard who were mainstays of the team over the following decade.

In 2004, St Kilda won a club record of 10 consecutive matches from round 1 to round 10. The club returned to finals, eventually being defeated by eventual premiers Port Adelaide in a preliminary final. The following year saw a similar result, with the club being defeated in a preliminary final by Sydney.

The 2006 AFL season saw the club finish in sixth position at the end of the home and away rounds and qualify for a third successive finals series. St Kilda were eliminated by Melbourne in the elimination finals. During this season, Robert Harvey broke the all-time games record for St Kilda when he played in his 324th premiership season match in Round 7. On 11 October 2006, Ross Lyon was appointed as the new head coach for St Kilda, replacing Grant Thomas.

After missing finals in 2007, St Kilda again qualified for the finals in 2008. A 108-point win over Essendon in the final home and away round saw the club take fourth position for the finals series. St Kilda were defeated by Geelong in the qualifying finals, defeated Collingwood in the semi-finals and were eliminated by the eventual premiers, Hawthorn, in the preliminary final.

St Kilda's 2009 season is considered one of the most dominant home and away seasons in AFL history. The club won 20 games - the best ever home and away record for the club - as well as winning 19 games in a row before being defeated by Essendon. In Round 14, St Kilda defeated Geelong by six points, with both teams being undefeated prior to the match. The game broke multiple records, including highest ever crowd for an AFL match at Docklands Stadium (54,444). The game was sold out two weeks in advance, causing a change in timeslot (moving from 2:10 pm to 3:10 pm) so that the Seven Network could broadcast the game live in Victoria.
St Kilda eventually progressed to that year's grand final, when they were defeated by Geelong by 12 points. Following the grand final, Ross Lyon signed a three-year extension to his coaching contract until the end of the 2012 season.

The following year, St Kilda experienced a similar level of success, qualifying for the finals in third position. The club recorded their first win against Geelong in a finals match in the 2nd qualifying final and eventually qualified for the Grand Final against Collingwood. The match ended in a draw – the third drawn grand final in VFL/AFL history. St Kilda midfielder Lenny Hayes won the Norm Smith Medal for the player judged best on ground in the match, making him the first St Kilda player to ever win the medal. Owing to the draw, a second grand final match was played the following week. In the grand final replay, Collingwood won by 56 points.

In December 2010, the club was granted ownership of the Linen House Centre, a new training and administration property in the City of Frankston at Seaford valued at approximate $11 million. Following the season, the club announced a record net profit of $7.467 million for season 2010. St Kilda also achieved a new record membership for a single season and were the 2nd most-watched team on television, rating 22,777,092 viewers across the season.

Following a loss in their 2011 elimination final, Ross Lyon left the club, despite one year remaining on his contract, to coach . Former Sydney, Fremantle and West Coast player and Collingwood assistant coach Scott Watters was announced as Lyon's replacement in October 2011.

2012–present: Post grand finals struggles and rebuild

The years after the departure of Ross Lyon did not prove fruitful for St Kilda. They failed to make the finals in 2012 for the first time since 2007 and continued poor performances ultimately culminated in the club finishing last in 2014. Despite this, the 2013 season marked a historic moment for St Kilda and the AFL, when St Kilda hosted the first premiership match outside of Australia in New Zealand. Following the 2013 season, senior coach Scott Watters was sacked. On 14 November, former Port Adelaide director of coaching Alan Richardson was announced as new senior coach for the next three years.

Following further poor performances in the 2018 and 2019 seasons, Richardson was advised that his contract would not be renewed for 2020. As a result, he resigned from his position as senior coach. Assistant coach Brett Ratten took over as caretaker coach. After winning three of the season's last six games, Ratten was appointed permanent senior coach in September 2019. During the 2019 trade period, four high-profile players requested a trade to St Kilda and many discussions were held with other players looking to move.

In the shortened 2020 season, the club managed 10 of a possible 17 wins to qualify for their first finals series since 2011.

AFLW involvement 

In 2017, following the inaugural AFL Women's (AFLW) season, St Kilda was among eight clubs that applied for licences to enter the competition from 2019 onwards. In September 2017, the club was announced as one of four clubs to receive a licence to join the competition in 2020.

Club identity
The club's on-field nickname is the "Saints", usage of which dates back to as early as the 1870s. Many clubs' early nicknames were derived from an abbreviation or demonym of the club's suburb, but St Kilda is unique among the AFL clubs in now utilising this as its official nickname. Dating back to as early as the 1890s, and to as late as the 1950s, the "Seagulls" was also in use as a nickname, but this has fallen out of use.

Uniforms
St Kilda's home guernsey has three vertical panels of red, white and black on the front, with the club crest located on the left breast of the guernsey. The guernsey has a plain black back, white ribbing and white numbers. The away guernsey is identical to the home guernsey.

The clash guernsey is similar to the other two guernseys, but has two extra white panels on either side of the red and black panels. The guernsey has a white back, with the tri-colour panels continuing below the number, it retains the white ribbing of the other guernseys, and has black numbers.

Evolution

Logos
St Kilda has used multiple different logos since it was formed in 1873. Prior to 1976, no clubs in the VFL used logos in an official capacity.

Many early club logos were printed in the same shield design frame and had each club's individual colours, name and design in them. St Kilda used a consistent design in the 1970s and 1980s, featuring a stick figure bearing a halo, holding the competition's logo. In 1989, just prior to the league officially becoming the AFL, the club used a logo with a red white and black vertically striped design with the goal and behind posts on it, with a stick figure attempting a mark on it with a halo above its head, with the league logo and the club crest on top of either behind post. The VFL league logo was replaced with the AFL logo when the competition changed names in 1990.

The St Kilda Football Club crest first appeared officially on the jumper in 1933, after existing at the club for quite some time beforehand in basic design form. The crest became an iconic feature of the club's jumper – a well-known and recognisable symbol of the club. The crest also includes the club's motto, Fortius Quo Fidelius, which is usually translated as "Strength through Loyalty". As with the nickname "Saints", the club crest has no religious associations. A logo change before the start of the 1995 season saw the club make the decision to use the official club crest as the club's official logo in the league.

Club song
The club song is an adaption of "When The Saints Go Marching In". The song was recorded in 1972 by the Fable Singers and released as a single. The song was recorded with all copyright and royalty agreements in place and the AFL has permission to broadcast it publicly at each St Kilda match. Prior to 1965, when St Kilda played at the Junction Oval, the club's song was an adaptation of "I Do Like To Be Beside The Seaside".

Home grounds

Junction Oval: 1897―1964 
St Kilda's first home ground in the Victorian Football League was Junction Oval. The club used this ground until 1964, when it moved to Moorabbin Oval. The oval was formerly known as the St Kilda Cricket Ground and was originally established as the home of the St Kilda Cricket Club in 1856.

By the late 1950s, the St Kilda Football Club sought to move its playing base away from Junction Oval as it wanted to operate its own venue rather than continue being a tenant of another club. In 1959, the club made enquiries about a lease to play at and develop Elsternwick Park in the neighbouring suburb of Elsternwick, but no deal was signed.

During 2014, St Kilda became involved in discussions with the Victorian government to return as a co-tenant at Junction Oval alongside Cricket Victoria. As part of the proposals, St Kilda would utilise the oval as a training and administrative base, with the site to receive a second oval to accommodate the club. This proposal was later rejected by the Victorian government, and Junction Oval was converted into a full-time cricket venue as of 2015.

Moorabbin Oval: 1965―1992 

Moorabbin Oval has been St Kilda's training and administrative base since 1965, excluding an 8 year period between 2010 and 2018.

In March 1964, the club arranged a deal to move its playing, training and administrative base to Moorabbin Oval on Linton St, Moorabbin, with all home games at the new venue starting the 1965 season. The club signed a lease agreement in August 1964, giving the club access to all Moorabbin Oval facilities for 75 years, provided it completed required works at the ground to establish a social club, training facilities and spectator seating on the site in time for the 1965 Premiership season. The club had to invest a set amount, combined with funds from the local council, and complete the required works by a deadline date to ensure the agreement was ratified and the purchase was complete. Loans provided to St Kilda by the Council were to be repaid over the subsequent lease period.

Following the club's move away from using Moorabbin Oval as a home venue for playing games, it was retained as an administrative and training facility for the club. In 2007, the relationship between the club and the City of Kingston, who governs the suburb of Moorabbin, deteriorated. As a result, St Kilda announced that it would move its primary administrative and training base away from Moorabbin. After the 2010 season, the club temporarily moved to a new facility was built at Belvedere Park,  in Seaford. During this time period, the club continued to manage Moorabbin Oval, using it as a retail, museum, entertainment and occasional training venue.

In 2018, St Kilda returned to using Moorabbin Oval as their primary administrative and training facility, as part of a two-stage redevelopment deal, costing approximately 30 million dollars. Moorabbin Oval also serves as the primary home ground for the Sandringham Dragons and the Southern Football League as well as being the administrative centre for football development in the south-east.

Waverley Park: 1993―1999 

Waverley Park was opened by the Victorian Football League in 1970 under the name "VFL Park". The ground was constructed by the league for a variety of reasons, with the primary reason being the fact the ground would be owned by the VFL. As the majority of teams in the competition at the time did not have control over their home grounds, they were unable to exercise control over various aspects, such as ground drainage and ticket prices.

Since the 1960s, the AFL had been embarked on a strategy of ground rationalisation. During the 1990s, as part of this strategy, St Kilda opted to take a deal to move home games to Waverley Park from 1993 and renovate the ageing Moorabbin Oval for training, administration and social club purposes. The club voted in favour of the move in a weighted vote of members in July 1992. The club received $430,000 upfront and $120,000 per year for three years from the AFL's grounds rationalisation funds, which helped to clear some of the club's debt.

In 1999, the AFL announced that it would not schedule any further matches at Waverley Park, and that the stadium would be sold off to pay for the under-construction Docklands Stadium.

Docklands Stadium: 2000―present

In 2000, St Kilda moved to a new playing home at Docklands Stadium following the discontinuation of Waverley Park as a scheduled ground.

Docklands Stadium was conceived as a multi-purpose venue to be used for Australian rules football, soccer, rugby and other general entertainment events. The AFL sought to replace Waverly Park, which would have been nearly 30 years old in 2000. The decision to build a new stadium was supported by the AFL due to issues regarding accessibility and Waverly Park, with the league stating there would be no improvement to the situation if upgrades were made to the stadium, and any upgrades would result in little financial return. The stadium was designated to be in the Docklands region of Melbourne, behind Southern Cross Station, and was designed to hold 52,000 people. The stadium cost approximately $460 million dollars to construct. Exclusive ownership of the ground was later purchased by the AFL in October 2016.

Due to Waverly Park being disused following the construction of Docklands Stadium, St Kilda, alongside fellow tenants Hawthorn, were forced to find a new home ground. As part of the initial arrangement, both clubs were planned to play a significant number of games at the stadium, however, only St Kilda would move to the ground. St Kilda set the attendance record for the ground in 2009, when 54,444 people attended a match against Geelong. Other former club players also hold records at the venue, with Lenny Hayes holding the record for most games played at the venue, and Nick Riewoldt holding the record for most goals kicked.

Additional facilities 

St Kilda's primary administrative and training base from late 2010 until 2018 was the 'Linen House Centre' at Belvedere Park in Seaford.
The creation of the base came about due to disagreements between St Kilda and the City of Kingston's council regarding proposed upgrades to their Moorabbin facilities, which included the implementation of 80 poker machines. The club subsequently negotiated a deal with the neighbouring City of Frankston, to develop Frankston Park into its new training base. However, when proposed costs blew out by $5 million dollars, a new agreement was formed between the two entities. In this new deal, the club would develop Belvedere Park in conjunction with the Frankston City Council, the Victorian state government and the AFL. The cost of developing the facilities was valued at approximately $11 million dollars. The centre received its name as part of a naming rights sponsorship deal with Linen House.

The club signed a lease on the facility until 2059. The club, however, chose to relocate back to Moorabbin Oval as its primary administrative and training base by 2018. As a result, in December 2020, St Kilda made a proposal to the Frankston City Council to repurpose the facility as a centre to be used by the wider Frankston community.

Playing squad

Current AFL squad

Reserves teams
St Kilda operated its own reserves team from 1919 to 2000. From 1919 to 1991 the VFL/AFL operated a reserves competition and, from 1992 to 1999, a de facto AFL reserves competition was run by the Victorian State Football League. St Kilda fielded a reserves team in both of these competitions, allowing players who were not selected for the senior team to play for St Kilda in the lower grade. During that time, the St Kilda reserves team won three premierships (1942, 1943 and 1961). Following the demise of the AFL reserves competition, the St Kilda reserves team competed in the new Victorian Football League in the 2000 season before the team was dissolved at the end of the year.

In 2001, St Kilda entered a reserves affiliation with existing VFL club Springvale (which moved to Cranbourne and was renamed Casey in 2006). Under the affiliation, reserves players for St Kilda played VFL football with Springvale/Casey. The affiliation ended after the 2008 season and St Kilda then entered an equivalent affiliation with Sandringham which it still maintains as of 2022.

St Kilda had announced its intention to end its affiliation with Sandringham and re-establish its own reserves team in the VFL from the 2017 season after a redevelopment of Moorabbin Oval was completed; but the club ultimately extended and expanded its affiliation with Sandringham. From 2017, St Kilda has had a greater involvement in the operation of the VFL club and, from 2018, Sandringham plays three games per year at Moorabbin Oval in St Kilda colours.

Corporate

Administrative board
 President: Andrew Bassat
 Vice president: Russell Caplan
 Chief executive officer: Matt Finnis
 Director: Dean Anderson
 Director: Jennifer Douglas
 Director: Paul Kirk
 Director: Jack Rush
 Director: Danni Roche
 Director: Adam Hilton

Sponsors

Principal partners
 CMC Markets
 Pepper Money

Major sponsors
 Red Rooster
 RSEA Safety

Elite partners
 AIA
 AVJennings
 Furphy Beer
 Jayco
 Mosh
 New Balance
 Opal
 Webcentral

Apparel sponsors
 Puma (1997–2001)
 Sekem (2002–2003)
 Piping Hot (2003–2006)
 Skins (2007)
 ISC (2008–2016, 2020)
 BLK (2017–2019)
 New Balance (2021–present)

Supporters
St Kilda has historically had a large fanbase around the Bayside suburbs of Melbourne, such as St Kilda, with one in five AFL club members in the region being a St Kilda member. The club also has strong support in the south-east regions of Melbourne. Politically, a poll of the club's supporter base indicated a small first party voting preference (39.7%) for the Coalition over the Labor Party (36.9%). The suburb of St Kilda has a significant Jewish community and the club has a strong following from this community.

Number one ticket holders 
Notable St Kilda supporters who have also been the club's number one ticket holders include:
 
 Eric Bana – actor and comedian
 Lindsay Fox – former club president and St Kilda player
 Elle MacPherson – model and actress
 John Moran – former St Kilda player

Membership and attendance

Partnerships

New Zealand partnership 

In September 2012, St Kilda announced that they had signed a three-year partnership with the Wellington City Council to play an annual match in New Zealand on Anzac Day (25 April) at Westpac Stadium as part of the day's commemorations. As a result of the partnership, St Kilda and the Sydney Swans became the first two AFL clubs to play for premiership points outside of Australia. Although the partnership was extended by three years in 2013, a review conducted in 2015 saw the conclusion of the partnership.

In 2018, AFL New Zealand and St Kilda both expressed interest in signing a new partnership in the future with matches hosted in Auckland rather than Wellington.

China partnership 

In October 2018, St Kilda signed a three-year deal to replace  as 's opponents in their annual match played in China. The three-year deal was expected to earn St Kilda more than $2 million in addition to any commercial earnings. In 2019, 4.01 million people watched the match between the two clubs. Owing to the COVID-19 pandemic, the match was not played in the 2020 or 2021 seasons.

Commemorative boards

Honour board

Team of the century 
At a special function in 2003, the St Kilda Football Club Team of the Century was announced. Darrel Baldock, who captained the 1966 grand final team, was named as captain and Allan Jeans, the only premiership-winning coach of the club, was named as coach. Ian Stewart was also named a member of the AFL Team of the Century.

Hall of fame 

St Kilda Football Club's Hall of Fame was established in 2003. Club identities, past or present, are selected and inducted into the hall of fame by a committee. The club has inducted 48 members into its hall of fame since its inception.

Achievements

Club achievements

Individual achievements

Trevor Barker Award (Club best and fairest)

Brownlow Medal (League best and fairest)
 1925 – Colin Watson
 1957 – Brian Gleeson
 1958 – Neil Roberts
 1959 – Verdun Howell
 1965 – Ian Stewart
 1966 – Ian Stewart
 1967 – Ross Smith
 1987 – Tony Lockett
 1997 – Robert Harvey
 1998 – Robert Harvey

Norm Smith Medal (AFL Grand Final best on ground)
 2010 – Lenny Hayes

Leigh Matthews Trophy (AFLPA Most Valuable Player)
 1987 – Tony Lockett
 1997 – Robert Harvey
 2004 – Nick Riewoldt

Coleman Medal (Leading Goal Kicker)
 1902 – Charlie Baker
 1936 – Bill Mohr
 1956 – Bill Young
 1987 – Tony Lockett
 1991 – Tony Lockett
 2004 – Fraser Gehrig
 2005 – Fraser Gehrig

AFL Rising Star (Best player under 21)
 2001 – Justin Koschitzke
 2002 – Nick Riewoldt

All-Australian teams
An All-Australian team is considered a "best-of" selection of players for each calendar year, with each player usually represented in their own team position. The All-Australian teams are selected by a panel.
The concept of an All-Australian "team of the year" was first pioneered by Sporting Life Magazine in 1947, which created a team each year until 1955. No St Kilda players featured in these teams.

This concept was later adopted by the interstate carnivals and the Australian Football League. All teams from the interstate carnivals and the AFL have been endorsed as official by governing bodies of the sport, such as the Australian National Football Council and the AFL, whilst teams selected by Sporting Life are not recognised.

Interstate carnivals
 Neil Roberts – 1956
 Ian Stewart – 1966
 Darrel Baldock – 1966
 Bob Murray – 1969
 Travis Payze – 1972
 Bruce Duperouzel – 1980
 Danny Frawley – 1988

Australian Football League
 Geoff Cunningham – 1983
 Greg Burns – 1984
 Tony Lockett – 1987, 1991, 1992
 Danny Frawley – 1988
 Nicky Winmar – 1989, 1991, 1995
 Stewart Loewe – 1990, 1991, 1992
 David Grant – 1991
 Robert Harvey – 1992, 1994, 1995, 1996, 1997, 1998, 1999, 2003
 Nathan Burke – 1993, 1996, 1997, 1999
 Austinn Jones – 1997, 2004
 Peter Everitt – 1997, 1998
 Lenny Hayes – 2003, 2005, 2009
 Fraser Gehrig – 2004
 Nick Riewoldt – 2004, 2006, 2008, 2009, 2014
 Luke Ball – 2005
 Nick Dal Santo – 2005, 2009, 2011
 Sam Fisher – 2008
 Brendon Goddard – 2009, 2010
 Leigh Montagna – 2009, 2010
 Stephen Milne – 2011, 2012
 Sean Dempster – 2012
 Dan Butler – 2020
 Jack Steele – 2020, 2021

Records and statistics

See also

 Sport in Australia
 Sport in Victoria

Notes

References

External links

 

 
Australian Football League clubs
Australian rules football clubs in Melbourne
Australian rules football clubs established in 1873
Former Victorian Football League clubs
1873 establishments in Australia
Sport in the City of Port Phillip
St Kilda, Victoria
Sport in the City of Kingston (Victoria)